Jardim Olinda is the northernmost city in the Brazilian state of Paraná. The Saran Grande waterfall, located there, is the northernmost point in the state and in all Southern Brazil.

References 

Municipalities in Paraná
Populated places established in 1964